Manassil Oru Manjuthulli is a Malayalam language film. It was released in 2000.

Cast
Krishna Kumar as Mohandas
Nishanth Sagar as Manoj
Praveena as Maya
Jagathy Sreekumar as Parasahayam Adiyodi/Ramu
Kalpana as Rajamma
Saju Kodiyan as Manikandan
Manka Mahesh as Bharathi

References

2000 films
2000s Malayalam-language films
Films scored by Ravi